Jonas Kamlet, Ph. D.  (1914 – December 16, 1960) was an inventor, chemist, and a successful entrepreneur.  He founded Kamlet Chemical Laboratories in New York City. He invented a glucose test using a tablet to measure the amount of glucose in urine, a treated strip that could identify pregnancy, a fodder for ruminants that used newsprint, synthesis of biuret that could be used as an element of fodder along with hundreds of other patents. His wife, Edna Yadven Kamlet Rogers, assisted him in the activities of the Kamlet Laboratories. She was a resident of Sarasota, Florida and had ownership of the Kamlet Laboratory files.

Early life and education

Jonas and Edna met when they were nine years old at their parents’ summer cottages.  His family had emigrated from Poland and hers from Russia.  Both were educated in New York City.  Kamlet attended City College of New York where he majored in chemistry and minored in biology.  He graduated at the age of 16 during the Great Depression.  Edna Yadven majored in biology and minored in chemistry at the City University of New York.

With encouragement from his wife, Jonas Kamlet went to graduate school and got his Ph.D. from New York University in 1944 for his dissertation on the topic “The Synthesis of 5-Dialkylamino, 2-chloropentanes.  An investigation into the Mechanism of Olefine Formation by the Alkaline Scission of N, N-Dialkylpiperdinium Salts” (Proquest, 2005).

Career
The Kamlet Laboratory (East 43rd Street, New York, NY) was founded in 1940 after Kamlet and Yadven were married. Aside from some laboratory staff, Kamlet and his wife ran the laboratory on their own. They specialized in consulting and developing of inventions.  They would then sell the patent rights to interested companies. They outsourced the analysis and development work to others but they divided the work in such a way that only they knew how the product was completed and patented (Rogers, 2005).  Most years, they would have up to ten firms that the Laboratory served as consultants for including firms such as Crown Zellerback and DuPont. Even after his death, Kamlet’s widow continued this arrangement until her retirement in her sixties.

Patents
Jonas Kamlet came up with a plan for a tablet that could be used in a test for diabetes. He presented the idea to Miles Laboratory.   Here he worked with Walter Ames Compton and together they searched for a method to put reagents in an effervescent tablet that could detect the quantity of sugar in a test tube of urine. The scientists succeeded, and in 1941 Miles introduced the effervescent tablet Clinitest and they obtained a patent for it using a Chicago law firm.  This ultimately led to the development of the test strips used in diabetes testing.

Working with Miles Laboratories in conjunction with Kamlet Laboratories, he developed a process for extracting from paper mill wastes what, at that time, had been an expensive substance used to manufacture Vitamin B2 (Anon, 1960).  In addition to this, he developed a patent for the production of d-tartaric acid (Kamlet, 1943).  In all, he obtained eleven patents assigned to Miles Laboratories.

Aside from these, there was a patent for reducing carbohydrates in body fluids.  This method utilized a pill containing compounds that dissolved with a strong exothermic reaction without the use of an external heat source.  The pill consisted primarily of citric acid monohydrate, sodium hydroxide, and copper sulfate, and a color change (cuprous oxide) was used to identify glucose.

Some of Dr. Kamlet’s other inventions dealt with animal feed.   One such invention used newsprint for cattle feed.  When the newsprint was replaced by alfalfa then the digestibility increased by 25% (Kamlet, 1955).  Dr. Kamlet also used a “non-protein nitrogen supplement” in feeds and fodder. And he obtained a patent for the use of biuret for animal feed (Kamlet, 1956). Dow Chemicals bought this patent from Kamlet Laboratories for $250,000 along with any foreign royalties.  Subsequently, Dow Chemicals sold it to the Shah of Iran for $1 million.

Death

Dr. Kamlet died on December 16, 1960.  He was one of the 134 people who were killed in the 1960 New York mid-air collision between a TWA Lockheed Constellation and a United Air Lines DC-8 near Idlewild (now JFK) airport.  All 128 people aboard the two planes and six people on the ground died.  The United Airlines plane remained in the air for 8.5 miles and crashed onto Sterling Place and Seventh Avenue, igniting more than a dozen buildings.  Because of the bad weather, comparatively few pedestrians were about.

On the whole, verdicts regarding the lawsuits (which exceeded $300 million) predetermined that United Airlines was responsible for sixty-one percent of the claims, Trans World Airlines fifteen percent, and the U.S. government twenty-four percent. This was due to the fact that the FAA controllers were guiding the planes’ instrument landing approaches. In addition to the families of the deceased passengers and crew, local residents received settlements from United Airlines. Dr. Kamlet’s widow sued, and her judgment was upheld by the New York Supreme Court.  She received an award of $600,000 plus $45,000 interest.

After his death, Edna continued the work of the firm until she retired in about 1979.  In Sarasota, Florida, the Jonas Kamlet Library of the Sarasota Opera is named after him. Today, his collected works are kept in the University of South Florida Tampa Library. The works that Kamlet has left include many papers, journals, and other important documents. The Kamlet Collection documents fundamental chemistry achievements starting in 1940 and ending in the mid 1960s. They serve as a beneficial resource for generations of chemistry students.

References

External links
Jonas Kamlet
American Chemical Society
New York Architecture Images- Park Slope, Brooklyn
Jonas and Edna Kamlet/Kamlet Laboratories Records at the University of South Florida

20th-century American chemists
City College of New York alumni
1960 deaths
1914 births
Scientists from New York City
New York University alumni
American people of Polish descent
Victims of aviation accidents or incidents in 1960
Victims of aviation accidents or incidents in the United States
Accidental deaths in New York (state)